UDC may refer to:

Politics
Central African Democratic Union (Union Démocratique Centrafricaine), a political party in the Central African Republic
Christian Democratic Union (Dominican Republic) (Unión Demócrata Cristiana), a former political party  in the Dominican Republic
Christian Democratic Union (Ecuador) (Unión Demócrata Cristiana), political party in Ecuador
Democratic Union of Cameroon (Union Démocratique du Cameroun), a political party in Cameroon
Democratic Union of Catalonia (Unió Democràtica de Catalunya), a political party in Spain
Nicaraguan Christian Democratic Union (Unión Demócrata Cristiana), a political party in Nicaragua
Swiss People's Party (Union Démocratique du Centre), a political party in Switzerland
Union of the Centre (1993), a former political party in Italy
Union of the Centre (2002), a political party in Italy
Union of Christian and Centre Democrats (Unione dei Democratici Cristiani e dei Democratici di Centro), a political party in Italy
Union of Democratic Control, a British campaigning group set up to oppose the First World War
Union of the Right and Centre (Union de la droite et du centre), an electoral alliance in France
Umbrella for Democratic Change, a political party in Botswana

Government
Unified Development Code (also known as a Unified Development Ordinance), a local policy instrument that combines zoning regulations with other desired city regulations
Urban Development Corporation, a diversified public authority in New York State, United States
Urban District Council, a former level of local authority in England and Wales
Utah Department of Corrections, a government agency dedicated to the management and supervision of convicted felons in the State of Utah, United States
Uganda Development Corporation, an agency of the Government of Uganda, mandated to promote and facilitate the industrial and economic development of that country

Education
University of A Coruña (Universidade da Coruña), a university in A Coruña, Spain
University of the District of Columbia, a university in Washington, D.C., United States
University Development Center, an educational-work co-operational program operated by GE Aviation in the United States

Computing
Utah Data Center, a large data center maintained by the National Security Agency, United States
Utility Data Center, a Hewlett-Packard product designed to help deploy virtualized resources

Other uses
UDC Finance Limited, a wholly owned subsidiary of ANZ National Bank, New Zealand
United Daughters of the Confederacy, a national association of female descendants of Confederate war veterans
Universal Decimal Classification, a system of library classification derived from the Dewey Decimal Classification